The Museum of Nebraska Art (MONA) is the official art museum of the state of Nebraska.  The museum is located in Kearney, Nebraska, and is administratively affiliated with the University of Nebraska at Kearney.  The official charter of MONA makes it home to the Nebraska Art Collection, which is home to works by artists who were born in Nebraska, have lived in Nebraska, or have some connection to Nebraska.  MONA also hosts regular rotating exhibitions by living or historic artists who have some connection with the state of Nebraska.

History
The Nebraska Art Collection was first created in 1976 but initially lacked a permanent home.  In 1985 a state-appointed commission settled on a historic post office building in Kearney which was built in 1911 but was badly outmoded and slated for demolition.  The Neoclassical architecture, marble interiors, and spacious, well-lit rooms attracted the attention of museum officials, who purchased the disused building and refitted it.  In 1986 MONA opened there in its new permanent location.

The post office building was added to the National Register of Historic Places in 1981 as a fine example of the Neoclassical style, and is believed to be the oldest of its type in Kearney.

Collection

The Nebraska Art Collection covers over 175 years of art and art history.  Many historic artists with Nebraska connections have their work in the permanent collection, such as Alice Eliza Cleaver, Robert Henri, John Philip Falter, and Frank Rinehart.  MONA is also home to works by more modern artists, like Thomas Hart Benton, Wright Morris, and Leonard Thiessen, as well as living artists such as Jun Kaneko and Jane Golding Marie.

Additionally, the Collection includes works by artist explorers who documented early Native American life and natural history in Nebraska, including George Catlin, John James Audubon, and Karl Bodmer.  Exhibitions of these artists are often supplemented with art and historical artifacts from other Nebraska museums, including the Stuhr Museum of the Prairie Pioneer, Joslyn Art Museum, and the University of Nebraska State Museum.

MONA and the Nebraska Art Collection also play host to rotating exhibitions by currently active Nebraska artists who are building reputations but do not yet have their work in permanent collections.  Notable exhibition participants have included polymer artist Sandra Williams, photographer Roger Bruhn, and sculptor Elizabeth Kronfield.

Special programs

In addition to its role as a museum, MONA is host to several special programs. It cultivates close relationships with public schools and frequently has students in for art viewing, hands-on art-making events, and summer art camps.  MONA also has periodic art-making classes for adults, usually in the summer.  The museum usually participates in Christmas activities put on by downtown Kearney merchants, and has hosted evening fairs where Nebraska artists and artisans sell small art objects.

MONA is host to ARTreach, a program of touring art exhibitions throughout Nebraska.  Host organizations pay a nominal fee and are permitted to host an exhibition for four to six weeks.  The exhibitions are drawn from the permanent collection, not the rotating exhibitions.  Most ARTreach exhibitions are organized around themes, including Women Artists from the MONA Collection , Images of Land, and Afro Psalms.

In recent years MONA has also played host to the Reynolds Readers and Writers Series, organized by Charles Fort.  This series brings writers, novelists, and storytellers to Nebraska for public readings and classes.  The series is primarily organized and funded by the University of Nebraska at Kearney, and the visiting artists participate in creative writing classes on campus in addition to their evening readings at the museum.

References

External links

Museum of Nebraska Art - official website

University of Nebraska at Kearney
Art museums and galleries in Nebraska
University museums in Nebraska
Museums in Buffalo County, Nebraska
Art museums established in 1976
Museum Of Nebraska Art
Buildings and structures in Kearney, Nebraska
Post office buildings on the National Register of Historic Places in Nebraska
Government buildings completed in 1911
National Register of Historic Places in Buffalo County, Nebraska